Bruce Hanna (born April 1960) is a Republican politician from Roseburg in the U.S. state of Oregon. He served in the Oregon House of Representatives, representing District 7, which spans Lane and Douglas counties. He was the co-speaker of the House for the 2011–2012 session along with Democrat Arnie Roblan.

Political career
Hanna was first appointed to the House in 2004, to fill a seat vacated by fellow Republican Jeff Kruse. In that session, Hanna served on the House Interim Committee on Agriculture and Natural Resources. He is the president of the Roseburg Coca-Cola Bottling Plant.

He was chosen as minority leader in August 2007, to serve for the remainder of the 74th Oregon legislature. In that capacity he succeeded Wayne Scott, who resigned the post and did not seek reelection in 2008.

The outcome of the 2010 Oregon House of Representatives elections left the House in a 30–30 tie. Hanna was elected by his colleagues to serve as co-speaker of the Oregon House of Representatives for the 76th Legislative Assembly, along with Democrat Arnie Roblan.

Hanna did not seek reelection in 2014. He was succeeded by Republican Cedric Ross Hayden, a dentist and rancher from Fall Creek.

References

External links 
 Official House web page

1960 births
Living people
Republican Party members of the Oregon House of Representatives
Politicians from Roseburg, Oregon
Bushnell University alumni
Speakers of the Oregon House of Representatives
21st-century American politicians